Cross Estate Gardens, containing both formal and native plant gardens, is located at 61 Jockey Hollow Road, Bernardsville, Somerset County, New Jersey. It is on the New Jersey Brigade Encampment Site of the Morristown National Historical Park. The property was acquired in 1975 by the National Park Service.

History
The property was originally called "Queen Anne Farm" by the owners Mr. and Mrs. John Anderson Bensel between 1903 and 1906. It included a 23-room stone house and stone water tower. The next owners, W. Redmond and Julia Appleton Newbold Cross, called it "Hardscabble House" in 1929. The property was later acquired by the National Park Service in 1975 from their children.

Gallery

References

External links
 
 

Gardens in New Jersey
Bernardsville, New Jersey
Morristown National Historical Park